Bubblegum Perfume is the second compilation album by English alternative rock band Felt, released in 1990. It collects tracks from the band's singles and albums recorded for Creation Records between 1986 and 1988. Tracks 5, 8, 13, 16 and 19 are instrumental.

In a review for Melody Maker, Bob Stanley described the album as "an excellent Felt primer for the uninitiated."

In 2011 Bubblegum Perfume was reissued by Cherry Red with three changes to the track listing: track 12 was replaced by "Tuesday's Secret", track 14 by "Female Star", and track 15 by the instrumental "Fire Circle".

Track listing

Personnel
Felt
Lawrence
Martin Duffy
Marco Thomas
Mick Bund
Gary Ainge
with
Tony Willé
Neil Scott
Rose McDowell
Richard Thomas
Francis Sweeney
Philip King
Mick Travis

References 

Felt (band) albums
Creation Records albums